The Hound of the Baskervilles (a.k.a. Sir Arthur Conan Doyle's The Hound of the Baskervilles) is a 1983 British made-for-television mystery thriller film directed by Douglas Hickox, starring Ian Richardson as Sherlock Holmes and Donald Churchill as Dr. John H. Watson.  It is based on Arthur Conan Doyle's 1902 novel The Hound of the Baskervilles.

Production

In 1982, American producer Sy Weintraub partnered with English producer Otto Plaschkes to make six television films of Sherlock Holmes stories. Charles Edward Pogue was enlisted to pen the screenplays but only The Sign of the Four and The Hound of the Baskervilles were ultimately filmed before Granada Television's Sherlock Holmes series premiered in 1984. A proposed third film, Hands of a Murderer (originally entitled The Prince of Crime) was eventually made with Edward Woodward as Sherlock Holmes and John Hillerman as Dr. John H. Watson.

In an interview with Scarlet Street, Ian Richardson explained:

Denholm Elliott was cast as Dr. Mortimer having previously portrayed Stapleton in the comedy spoof version of the Hound starring Dudley Moore and Peter Cook. He also appeared with "Hound" co-star Connie Booth in the spoof The Strange Case of the End of Civilization as We Know It. Booth herself would later appear in 1987s The Return of Sherlock Holmes.

A large part of Martin Shaw's American accent was dubbed by another actor in post-production.

Cast
Ian Richardson as Sherlock Holmes
Donald Churchill as Dr. John H. Watson
Martin Shaw as Sir Henry Baskerville
Nicholas Clay as Jack Stapleton/Sir Hugo Baskerville
Glynis Barber as Beryl Stapleton
Brian Blessed as Geoffrey Lyons
Eleanor Bron as Mrs. Barrymore
Edward Judd as Barrymore
Connie Booth as Laura Lyons
Denholm Elliott as Dr. Mortimer
Ronald Lacey as Inspector Lestrade
David Langton as Sir Charles Baskerville
Cindy O'Callaghan as Maid
Francesca Gonshaw as Young Girl in Mire

Differences from novel
The story's prologue retelling the Baskerville legend differs from the novel with the inclusion of a scene where Lord Baskerville rapes the fugitive girl after catching her, and the girl surviving when Baskerville is fatally mauled by the Hound.
A sniping attempt which does not occur in the original novel is made against Sir Henry.
Inspector Lestrade is assigned the task of arresting Seldon. Unlike previous versions of the story, he is revealed to be the policeman who arrested Seldon.
Brian Blessed's character Geoffrey Lyons never appears in the novel. In the film version, Lyons is presented as an imposing suspect who is at one point falsely imprisoned for strangling his wife. Holmes' solution to the case ultimately frees him.
The film's Geoffrey Lyons performs the feat of bending a fire iron as an intimidation tactic which was originally performed by Dr. Grimesby Roylott in "The Adventure of the Speckled Band".
Laura Lyons dies in the film, strangled by the murderer to protect his identity. She does not die in the novel.
Stapleton's demise in the bog is included as a part of the film's climax. He ambushes Holmes, Watson and Beryl outside the Hound's lair, but is chased by Holmes into the moor; he stumbles into the mire and sinks to his doom, despite Holmes' attempts to save him. The novel does not depict Stapleton's demise; he simply disappears on the moor and is assumed to have drowned in the mire.

Reception
Cinema Retro called the film "a cracking piece of entertainment...with lush production values that completely belie its TV movie origins." Matthew Bunson in The Enclyclopedia Sherlockiana praised the "first rate" production and Ronald Lacey's performance as Lestrade but felt that Richardson's interpretation of Holmes was "a bit too amiable."

See also
The Sign of Four (1983 film)

References

External links

1983 television films
1983 films
1980s mystery thriller films
Films based on The Hound of the Baskervilles
Films directed by Douglas Hickox
British thriller television films
British mystery thriller films
Sherlock Holmes films
Films with screenplays by Charles Edward Pogue
1980s British films